Bert Wollants (born 30 August 1979 in Lier) is a Belgian politician and is affiliated to the N-VA. He is replacing Kris Van Dijck as a member of the Belgian Chamber of Representatives from 2010 on.

Notes

Living people
Members of the Chamber of Representatives (Belgium)
New Flemish Alliance politicians
1979 births
People from Lier, Belgium
21st-century Belgian politicians